Deconhil Shipping Company was a shipping company founded in San Francisco, California. Deconhil Shipping Company president was Joseph  J. Coney. Joseph  J. Coney also had part ownership of the San Francisco tanker company Hillcone Steamship Company since 1929. Deconhil Shipping Company operated Fleet Oilers for the United States Navy to support World War II efforts. Deconhil Shipping Compan operated a fleet of tankers for the War Shipping Administration.  Deconhil Shipping Compan operated Type T2 tankers and other tankers. Each War Deconhil Shipping Compan had a merchant crew of about 9 officers and 39 men. War Emergency Tankers continued operations after the war for a few years.   

Some ships:
USS Nausett (IX-190)
SS Chemawa,  Civilian Deconhil Shipping Company crew with United States Navy Armed Guard

Deconhil Shipping Company crew operated the ships and the US Navy supplied United States Navy Armed Guards to man the deck guns and radio. The most common armament mounted on these merchant ships were the MK II 20mm Oerlikon autocannon and the 3"/50, 4"/50, and 5"/38 deck guns.

See also
World War II United States Merchant Navy

References

External links
 The T2 Tanker page
 T-tanker list

American companies established in 1942
Transport companies established in 1942
Defunct shipping companies of the United States